Fairfield, Virginia may refer to:

Fairfield, part of Sandston, Virginia, in Henrico County
Fairfield (Berryville, Virginia)
Fairfield, Rockbridge County, Virginia

See also
Fairfield Plantation (Gloucester County, Virginia)